Alessio Milillo (born 31 March 1997) is an Italian footballer who plays as a defender for  club Arzignano.

Club career
He made his Serie C debut for Teramo on 29 October 2017 in a game against AlbinoLeffe.

On 15 January 2020 he joined Lecco. On 12 August 2020 he moved to Mantova.

On 18 August 2022, Milillo signed with Fidelis Andria.

On 25 January 2023, Milillo moved to Arzignano until the end of the 2022–23 season.

References

External links
 
 

1997 births
People from Ortona
Sportspeople from the Province of Chieti
Footballers from Abruzzo
Living people
Italian footballers
Association football defenders
Serie C players
Serie D players
Delfino Pescara 1936 players
S.S. Teramo Calcio players
U.S. Viterbese 1908 players
Calcio Lecco 1912 players
Mantova 1911 players
S.S. Fidelis Andria 1928 players
F.C. Arzignano Valchiampo players